Sick-Love is the debut remix album by V/Vm, an alias of English musician Leyland Kirby. Released in 2000, it samples and distorts several 1980s pop songs about love, distorting them to create a sinister atmosphere. The album is mostly unavailable physically because of copyright laws; V/Vm later released the similar album The Green Door. Met with a positive reception from music critics, the album and its single received airplay on various radio stations, achieving the NME title of single of the week.

Composition
Sick-Love comprises several covers of 1980s pop songs about love that are put through various sound effects, such as pitch shifting. Most of the songs are recognizable for those who have listened to them before; however, they are distorted to an extreme noise, though not as much as V/Vm's other album The Green Door. Artists and bands sampled include East 17, Bobby Brown, Billy Joel, Berlin, the Bee Gees, Elton John, Robbie Williams, the Beatles, John Lennon, Boyzone, and Yazoo. Other dance and disco tracks of the record feature new vocals or distortions of existing ones that make the original samples nearly unrecognizable. There are sound effects such as background buzz noises, saxophones with distorted notes, and growling vocals.

The third track, "The Lady in Red (Is Dancing With Meat)", samples the song of same name by singer Chris de Burgh and distorts it with the intent of rendering it sinister. Its vocal drone is pitched down and distorted so as to sound akin to releases of the Raster-Noton record label. The following track, "I Need Lard" loops several lyrics of its original sample, "I Need Love" by rapper LL Cool J. In "Just the Way You Are XX", the sample is modified in order to become more mutant, while "A Perfect Moment" remakes the style of the English band Portishead. By "Take My Beef Away", sampling "Take My Breath Away" (June 1986) by Berlin, Kirby slows down the synth, making the chorus sound akin to a death wish.

Release
Sick-Love was released in the year of 2000 by Kirby's self-operated label V/Vm Test. In a 2008 interview, Kirby said Sick-Love and his other work with pop under the V/Vm alias already explored memory; his later releases under the Caretaker alias would explore memory loss. The musician said most people dismissed Sick-Love as a joke when, according to him, it "was about recontextualisation and memory just as much as any Caretaker album was." The record is mostly unavailable physically because of copyright laws, which may be the reason as to why the most recent samples are the ones with most distortion.

The Green Door

The Green Door, V/Vm's next release, is very similar to Sick-Love, distorting several disco and pop songs. Like Sick-Love, it does not acknowledge copyright issues. In addition to artists already sampled by Sick-Love, The Green Door has the work of Wham!, Falco, Lionel Richie, and Michael Jackson. In addition to pitch shifting, it also features glitch effects; some are unaltered, whereas others are distorted to an extreme.

"I'd Rather Jack Than Fleetwood Mac" presents the adrenaline of the album, while tracks such as "A Day Up North" and "He Ain't Heavy He's My Butcher" are more noise-like, akin to Merzbow. However, some of the unaltered tracks, such as "This Ole House", as well as the title track, feature normal kids songs. Mark Weddle's review of The Green Door for Brainwashed said its silly sound is what one would except released from V/Vm. Weddle felt that, while the music's nature is questionable, it is still done well, concluding: "why bother?"

The artwork features the character 'Shakey', which is named after Shakys single "Green Door" by Welsh singer Shakin' Stevens. The character speaks:

Reception

Sick-Love was met with a positive reception from music critics, who praised its distortion of pop songs. AllMusic critic Tim DiGravina felt that, while it may be "first-class sonic thievery and manipulation," it would not be a record that listeners "would want to return to with great frequency." Paul Simpson of the same website argued that, for the public that has "a downright evil sense of humor, this is simply one of the best albums ever made." Writing for NME, Stephen Dalton called Sick-Love "a brutally disturbing treatise on pop and our love/hate relationship with it." The Igloo Magazine said the album was fantastic, along with V/Vm's albums of commemorative dates. However, Mark Weddle's more negative review for Brainwashed opined that the album "is fun and funny but the theme and gimmick get a bit old after awhile", and that The Green Door is more varied.

Sick-Love received airplay from several radio stations. This includes ABC, WPRB, WFMU, RTRFM, KFJC, and BBC Radio 1. The single "The Lady In Red (Is Dancing With Meat)" was later named by NME as single of the week. The song was also included in the Rewired program of The Wire.

Track listing
Adapted from Brainwashed. Note and total length adapted from AllMusic. Samples adapted from Brainwashed, AllMusic, NME, and Freaky Trigger, as well as from the names of the songs themselves.

References

External links
 
 
 
 

2000 debut albums
James Leyland Kirby albums